Codex Ambrosianus may refer to:

Codices Ambrosiani, five manuscripts containing rare text in the Gothic language
Codex Ambrosianus 435, containing Aristotle's On the Soul
Codex Ambrosianus 837, containing Aristotle's On the Soul